Pakalniškiai (formerly) is a village in Kėdainiai district municipality, in Kaunas County, in central Lithuania. According to the 2011 census, the village had a population of 19 people. There is a water tower.

There was an okolica of Pakalniškiai (a property of the Vaitkevičiai and Sasnauskai) at the beginning of the 20th century.

Demography

References

Villages in Kaunas County
Kėdainiai District Municipality